Gerardo Adrián Traverso Píriz  (7 October 1975 – 17 May 2019) was an Uruguayan football player.

Club career
Traverso moved to Paraguay as a youth player and began his professional career with Rubio Ñú before moving to Nacional in the Primera División de Paraguay. He played on loan for Barcelona in Serie A de Ecuador. He also had a brief spell with Dundee in the Scottish Premier League.

Traverso's career ended following a serious injury sustained in an automobile crash in Asunción in May 2004. His wife was also injured in the accident.

References

1975 births
2019 deaths
Footballers from Montevideo
Uruguayan footballers
Club Nacional footballers
Club Guaraní players
Cerro Porteño players
Sportivo Luqueño players
Tianjin Jinmen Tiger F.C. players
Barcelona S.C. footballers
Dundee F.C. players
Scottish Premier League players
Uruguayan expatriate footballers
Expatriate footballers in Mexico
Expatriate footballers in Ecuador
Expatriate footballers in Paraguay
Expatriate footballers in Scotland

Association football forwards